Jeptha Dudley New (November 28, 1830 – July 9, 1892) was a U.S. Representative from Indiana. He was the grandson of Jethro New, nephew of Robert A. New, brother of John C. New, and uncle of Harry Stewart New.

Born in Vernon, Indiana, New was graduated from Vernon (Indiana) Academy and Bethany College in West Virginia where he studied law.
He was admitted to the bar in 1851 and practiced in Vernon, Indiana, until 1864.
One of his law partners was Thomas W. Woollen, who would later become Indiana Attorney General.
New served as mayor of Vernon 1852-1854.
He served as prosecuting attorney of Jennings County, Indiana, from 1860 to 1864.
He served as judge of the district court of common pleas 1864-1868.
He resumed the practice of law in Vernon.

New was elected as a Democrat to the Forty-fourth Congress (March 4, 1875 – March 3, 1877).
He declined to be a candidate for reelection in 1876 to the Forty-fifth Congress.

New was elected to the Forty-sixth Congress (March 4, 1879 – March 3, 1881).
He was not a candidate for reelection in 1880.
He served as judge of the sixth judicial circuit of Indiana 1882-1888.
Appellate judge in 1891.
He was nominated by the Democratic Party as a candidate for judge of the supreme court of Indiana in 1892, but died before the election in Vernon, Indiana, July 9, 1892.
He was interred in Vernon Cemetery.

References

External links 
 

1830 births
1892 deaths
Bethany College (West Virginia) alumni
Indiana state court judges
People from Vernon, Indiana
Democratic Party members of the United States House of Representatives from Indiana
Mayors of places in Indiana
19th-century American politicians
19th-century American judges